Owzarlu (also Romanized as Owzarlū; also known as Ozārlū and Ozqalū) is a village in Nazluy-ye Jonubi Rural District, in the Central District of Urmia County, West Azerbaijan Province, Iran. At the 2006 census, its population was 217, in 62 families.

References 

Populated places in Urmia County